Alexander Sawers was a Scottish professional footballer who played as a full back.

References

Scottish footballers
Association football fullbacks
Clyde F.C. players
Burnley F.C. players
English Football League players
Year of death missing
Year of birth missing